The North Queensland Telegraph was a short-lived late-19th century Australian newspaper published in Townsville, Queensland.

History 
The newspaper was first published in 1885 as the North Queensland Telegraph and Territorial Separationist; it became the Northern Age and North Queensland Telegraph in 1889.

Publication ceased in 1891.

Footnotes 

Defunct newspapers published in Queensland
Publications established in 1885
Publications disestablished in 1891
Townsville